Euphaedra hastiri, the insipid striped forester, is a butterfly in the family Nymphalidae. It is found in Senegal, Guinea-Bissau, Guinea and Sierra Leone. Its habitat consists of forests.

Subspecies
Euphaedra hastiri hastiri (Senegal, Guinea-Bissau, Guinea)
Euphaedra hastiri polymnie Hecq, 1981 (western Sierra Leone)

References

Butterflies described in 1981
hastiri